Phylloporia bistrigella is a moth of the family Incurvariidae. It is found in western, northern and central Europe and north-eastern North America.

The wingspan is 7–9 mm.7-8 nnn. Head ochreous -fuscous. Forewings fuscous; a straight shining whitish fascia at 1/3, and another sometimes interrupted beyond middle; sometimes a whitish elongate discal spot beyond this. Hindwings grey.

The larvae feed on Betula species. They mine the leaves of their host plant, usually encircling a good part of the leaf, and finishing in a whitish blotch with scattered frass. It then cuts out an oval case from this position and drops to the ground. The leaf area enclosed within the mine becomes paler and vacated mines are quite distinctive.

References

External links
Swedish Moths
UKmoths
Images
Bug Guide
Fauna Europaea

Incurvariidae
Moths of Japan
Moths of Europe